Kimberley Reed (born 18 February 1995) is a Scottish hammer thrower. Her personal best throw of 55.98 metres—achieved at the 2011 Scottish School's Championships in Grangemouth, Scotland—is the current British U17 record.

Reed was born in Edinburgh, Scotland.

International competitions

References

External links
 

1995 births
Living people
Sportspeople from Edinburgh
British female hammer throwers
Scottish female hammer throwers